Roaring Fork is a  long 3rd order tributary to the Fisher River in Surry County, North Carolina.

Course
Roaring Fork rises on the divide of Ramey Creek about 2 miles south-southwest of High point Spur.  Roaring Fork then flows generally southeast to join the Fisher River about 1 mile south of Lowgap, North Carolina.

Watershed
Roaring Fork drains  of area, receives about 48.5 in/year of precipitation, has a wetness index of 272.01, and is about 74% forested.

See also
List of rivers of North Carolina

References

Rivers of North Carolina
Rivers of Alleghany County, North Carolina
Rivers of Surry County, North Carolina